Yasmine d'Ouezzan (born 9 January 1913 in Saint-Étienne, France, died 11 January 1997 in Paris, France) was a French carom billiards player. D'Ouezzan was the first woman to win the women's French Billiards championship in 1932.

References

1913 births
1997 deaths
French sportswomen
Female cue sports players
20th-century French women